Mississippi SB 2179 is a bill which passed the Mississippi State Senate in January 2010 regarding illegal immigration in Mississippi. Largely similar to Arizona SB 1070, this bill also makes it a state misdemeanor crime for an alien to be in Mississippi without carrying the required documents, bars state or local officials or agencies from restricting enforcement of federal immigration laws, and cracks down on those sheltering, hiring and transporting illegal aliens. Like Arizona SB 1070, the paragraph on intent in the legislation says it embodies an "attrition through enforcement" doctrine. The difference between this law and Arizona's is that immigration status must be determined at any lawful stop, detention or arrest made by a law enforcement official or a law enforcement agency where reasonable suspicion exists that the person is an alien and is unlawfully present in the United States.

This act was passed through the Mississippi Senate, 34-15,  and passed in the House, 80-36.

See also
 Utah Compact

Notes 

Illegal immigration to the United States
Mississippi law
2010 in American law
2010 in Mississippi